The Type 726 LCAC (with NATO reporting name Yuyi class) is a class of air-cushioned landing craft used by the People's Liberation Army Navy. Six Yuyi-class LCACs are believed to be in service with the People’s Liberation Army (PLA), with the first one (3320) being seen at the end of 2007. It is thought that the vessels were delivered in two batches, with the first three LCACs reportedly powered by Ukrainian UGT 6000 engines, while the remaining three are believed to use the indigenous QC-70 gas turbines. Up to four Yuyi-class LCACs can be carried in the well deck of the 210 m-long Yuzhao-class landing platform dock (LPD).

The Type 726 LCAC is greater in size than the US LCACs in service, but smaller than the Zubr-class LCAC and can carry only one main battle tank (e.g., Type 96) or four armored vehicles. 

The early variant, the Type 726, have encountered a number of technical problems that temporarily halted production of the class. This forced the four Type 071 LPDs to limit their projection capabilities to landing craft, amphibious IFVs and helicopters exclusively (not main battle tanks). However, recent commercial satellite imagery of China’s Jiangnan Shipyard near Shanghai shows that the country is producing additional Yuyi-class LCACs. Eight Type 726As that appeared to be nearly completed could be seen at the yard on 14 October 2020.

Eight Type 726s were seen at a Chinese at Damiao Naval Base on Nansan Island on 26 September 2020.

Ships of the class

Operators

 People's Liberation Army Navy (8+ units)

See also
 Landing Craft Air Cushion
 Engin de débarquement amphibie rapide
 Lebed-class LCAC
 LSF-II 631
 Tsaplya-class LCAC – Three in service with ROKN
 Zubr-class LCAC

References

Amphibious warfare vessels of the People's Liberation Army Navy
Military hovercraft
Landing craft